William A. Allen (born June 15, 1980) is an American professional stock car racing driver and team owner. He is the co-owner of Rackley WAR, a team that competes full-time in the NASCAR Camping World Truck Series and in late model racing. Allen previously competed as a driver in the NASCAR Xfinity Series, Truck Series (including a full season in 2007 where he won the Rookie of the Year award), and the ARCA Menards Series.

Racing career

Driving career
Allen made his NASCAR debut in the Craftsman Truck Series in 2005, driving the No. 47 Chevrolet Silverado for Morgan-Dollar Motorsports in the Kroger 200 at Martinsville Speedway, starting 21st and finishing sixth. He made one more start in 2005 for SS-Green Light Racing.

Allen ran the first two races of the 2006 ARCA Racing Series season in the No. 75 for Bob Schacht Motorsports, finishing 38th at Daytona and finishing fifth at Nashville. Towards the end of the year, he made his Busch Series debut, driving the No. 14 Dodge for FitzBradshaw Racing at Memphis, where he finished 28th, and Phoenix, where he finished 35th. He also ran the final race of the 2006 Truck Series season for ThorSport Racing in a part-time third truck for the team, the No. 87. This led to his running full-time with the team in 2007, where he replaced Kerry Earnhardt in the team's No. 13 truck. It was his first full season in NASCAR. After finishing the season 15th in the standings, with his only top ten of the season being a sixth-place finish at Talladega, Allen was replaced by Shelby Howard for the 2008 season.

In 2008, Allen started the season in the renamed Nationwide Series, running two races (Daytona and Nashville) in the Sadler Brothers Racing No. 95, with a best finish of 29th at Daytona. Later in the year, returned to Morgan-Dollar Motorsports in the Truck Series to drive three races in the No. 46 at Memphis, Kentucky and Nashville. In those three races, Allen was sponsored by the band Rascal Flatts, who were promoting their new album Still Feels Good on the truck. Shortly after rejoining the team, Morgan-Dollar was bought by New England Patriots player Randy Moss, who renumbered the truck to the No. 81 to match his jersey number in the NFL. However, Allen's plans were not affected by the change in ownership.

Allen attempted six Nationwide races in 2009 in the Nos. 92 and 96 for Whitney Motorsports, but failed to qualify for one race and started and parked in the other five races that he did qualify for. He returned to the Truck Series in 2010 for Team Gill Racing to drive their No. 46 in the race at Nashville, starting 36th and finishing 29th.

In the Nationwide Series, Allen drove the No. 05 31-W Insulation/CertainTeed/Cash America car for Day Enterprise Racing in 2010, running 18 races with a best finish of 11th. Allen also failed to qualify for four additional races. He returned to the team for two more races in 2011 before he was without a ride in any NASCAR series in 2012 and 2013.

Allen found a ride for 2014 in the Nationwide Series, driving multiple races with hopes of a full season in the No. 76 for the upstart Martins Motorsports team. Team owner/driver Tommy Joe Martins (who drove the team's other car, the No. 67) stated that the plan at the start of the season was for Allen to run full races in the No. 76, while Martins would start and park the No. 67. These plans fell apart after both Martins Motorsports cars failed to qualify for the spring race at Bristol, For the remainder of the season, the No. 67 would no longer be fielded (except for at Michigan) and Martins would drive the No. 76 himself instead of Allen. After not racing in the Truck Series for the previous three years, Allen drove Jennifer Jo Cobb's No. 0 start and park truck at Charlotte, his most recent start in NASCAR as a driver.

In 2021, Willie returned for the 2021 Chevrolet Silverado 250 at Talladega, his first NASCAR sanctioned race since 2014. He drove the #25 for Rackley WAR.

Team owner
After several years out of NASCAR, it was announced that Allen would return to the sport as an owner and would start a full-time team in the Truck Series in 2021 with Curtis Sutton, the owner of Rackley Roofing, which was the primary sponsor of the No. 68 Clay Greenfield Motorsports truck in 2020. With their co-ownership, they named the team Rackley WAR (Rackley for Sutton's company and WAR standing for "Willie Allen Racing"). The team currently fields the No. 25 Chevrolet Silverado for Matt DiBenedetto with sponsorship from Rackley Roofing and Chad Kendrick as crew chief.

Motorsports career results

NASCAR
(key) (Bold – Pole position awarded by qualifying time. Italics – Pole position earned by points standings or practice time. * – Most laps led.)

Nationwide Series

Camping World Truck Series

 Ineligible for series points

ARCA Re/Max Series
(key) (Bold – Pole position awarded by qualifying time. Italics – Pole position earned by points standings or practice time. * – Most laps led.)

References

External links
 
 
 
 

1980 births
NASCAR drivers
ARCA Menards Series drivers
CARS Tour drivers
People from Hickman County, Tennessee
Racing drivers from Tennessee
Living people